Korba Airport (IATA: none, ICAO: IN-0026) is a private airport located at Korba, in Chhattisgarh, India, and is operated by the Bharat Aluminium Company Limited (BALCO) for transport of cargo and steel from Korba Thermal and Steel Power Plant to other places. The Government of Chhattisgarh intended to expand this airport in order to support passenger traffic by making it a commercial and domestic airport, to facilitate tourism and socio-economic development in the region by promoting employment and connectivity.

References 

Defunct airports in India
Airports in Chhattisgarh
Korba district
Airports with year of establishment missing